Glasgow Tradeston was a burgh constituency represented in the House of Commons of the Parliament of the United Kingdom from 1885 until 1955. It elected one Member of Parliament (MP) using the first-past-the-post voting system.

Boundaries

The Redistribution of Seats Act 1885 provided that the constituency was to consist of the fifteenth and sixteenth Municipal Wards.

In 1918 the constituency consisted of "That portion of the city which is bounded by a line commencing at a point on the centre of Glasgow Bridge at the centre line of the River Clyde, thence southward along the centre line of Glasgow Bridge, Bridge Street and Eglinton Street to the centre line of the Glasgow and South Western Railway at Eglinton Street Station, thence westward along the centre line of the Glasgow and South Western Railway (Paisley Canal Line) to the centre line of Shields Road, thence northwards along the centre line of Shields Road to the centre line of the Caledonian Railway, thence westward along the centre line of the said Caledonian Railway and the Glasgow and Paisley Joint Railway to a point in line with the centre line of Church Road, thence northward along the centre line of Church Road, Whitefield Road, and the portion of Govan Road to the west of Princes Dock and continuation thereof to the centre line of the River Clyde, thence eastward along the centre line of the River Clyde to the point of commencement."

1918–1949: The County of the City of Glasgow wards of Kingston and Kinning Park

1950–1955: The County of the City of Glasgow wards of Kinning Park and Kingston, and part of Govan

Members of Parliament

Elections

Elections in the 1880s

Elections in the 1890s

Elections in the 1900s

 Stood as a 'Fiscal Reform' candidate

Elections in the 1910s

Elections in the 1920s

Elections in the 1930s

General Election 1939–40

Another General Election was required to take place before the end of 1940. The political parties had been making preparations for an election to take place and by the Autumn of 1939, the following candidates had been selected; 
Labour: Thomas Henderson
Unionist:

Elections in the 1940s

Elections in the 1950s

References

Historic parliamentary constituencies in Scotland (Westminster)
Constituencies of the Parliament of the United Kingdom established in 1885
Constituencies of the Parliament of the United Kingdom disestablished in 1955
Politics of Glasgow